Mocis texana, the Texas mocis, is a species of moth of the family Erebidae. It is found in eastern North America, from southern Ontario, south to Florida, west to Texas to Minnesota.

Adults are on wing from April to September.

The larvae feed on Digitaria species.

References

External links
Images
Bug Guide

Moths described in 1875
Moths of North America
texana